Rodrigo Andrés Piñeiro Silva (born 5 May 1999) is an Uruguayan footballer who plays as a winger or forward for Chilean Primera División club Unión Española.

Career
Piñeiro started his career with Miramar Misiones.

Nashville SC
On 3 February 2021, it was announced that Piñeiro was signed by Major League Soccer club Nashville SC.

References

External links
 

1999 births
Living people
Footballers from Montevideo
Uruguayan footballers
Association football forwards
Miramar Misiones players
Peñarol players
Boston River players
Rampla Juniors players
Danubio F.C. players
Nashville SC players
Unión Española footballers
Uruguayan Primera División players
Uruguayan Segunda División players
Chilean Primera División players
Expatriate footballers in Chile
Major League Soccer players